Aag Aandhi Aur Toofan is a 1994 Hindi language action movie directed by Kanti Shah and starring Mukesh Khanna, Kiran Kumar  and Upasana Singh.

Plot
The story revolves around attempts by several people to bring down Chandi, a vicious dacoit. Inspector Arjun Singh wants to destroy him to preserve the law. Durga, Seema, Geeta and Sikandar Khan, who all have reasons to seek revenge on Chandi, agree to help. During an encounter with Chandi, Arjun Singh is injured, but he saves everybody's life.
Another element of the plot involves Durga falling in love and marrying Chhalia. But when Durga learns that Chhalia is a traitor against their country, Durga kills him.

Cast
 Mukesh Khanna - Sikandar Khan
 Kiran Kumar - Inspector Arjun Singh
 Joginder - dacoid Chandi
 Upasana Singh - Durga
 Mukesh Goyal
 Sadhana Singh   
 Meena Singh - Geeta
 Ashok Raj - Suraj
 Shabnam - Seema
 Sameer - Chhalia

References

External links 
 
Aag Aandhi Aur Toofan on Movietalkies.com

1994 films
1990s Hindi-language films
Indian rape and revenge films
Indian action films
Films directed by Kanti Shah